The 1897–98 season was Stoke's ninth season in the Football League.

It was another season of struggle for Stoke who finished bottom of the First Division on goal average level on points with five teams. They entered the test matches for the second time against Newcastle United and Burnley and again came out victorious. However it was in controversial circumstances as in the final test match against Burnley, both sides needed a draw to be in the First Division for next season and for 90 minutes the Stoke and Burnley players did not attempt to win and the match finished in a 0–0 draw. After this obvious exploitation of the rules the league scrapped the test match system in favour of automatic promotion and relegation.

Season Review

League
In September 1897 Horace Austerberry was appointed secretary-manager of Stoke in succession of Bill Rowley who became general secretary. Also Mr J. T. Fenton assumed the role of chairman taking over from Mr. S. Barker. The Stoke directors continued to search in Scotland for quality players following the success of William Maxwell and they did find one in the form of Alex Raisbeck who went on to gain international caps for his country unfortunately he only played eight matches for Stoke before deciding to join Liverpool.

The bottom five teams in the First Division finished with 24 points but Stoke had the poorest goal average of them all and took bottom spot. They had to play the top two sides from the Second Division, Burnley and Newcastle United. Stoke came through successfully, beating each side once and drawing with Burnley to stay up.

In the final test match Stoke and Burnley needed a draw to be in the First Division next season. It finished 0–0 after a farcical 90 minutes during which neither side put in a challenge or had a shot at goal and at one point a few fans in the crowd held on to the ball and refused to return it to the players. After this obvious exploit of the rules the league scrapped the test match system in favour of automatic promotion and relegation.

FA Cup
Stoke beat Bury 2–1 in the first round but crashed out 5–1 to Everton in the second round replay.

Final league table

Results

Stoke's score comes first

Legend

Football League First Division

Test matches

FA Cup

Squad statistics

References

Stoke City F.C. seasons
Stoke